The Polsten was a Polish development of the 20 mm Oerlikon gun. The Polsten was designed to be simpler and much cheaper to build than the Oerlikon, without reducing effectiveness.

Development
When Nazi Germany invaded Poland in 1939, the Polish design team escaped to the U.K. and resumed work together with Czech and British designers. The need for the Polsten was apparently mooted in June 1941. It went into service in March 1944 alongside the Oerlikon. Both the Oerlikon and the Polsten used similar 60 round drum magazines, however, the Polsten could also use a simpler box magazine with 30 rounds. It remained in service into the 1950s.

Used like Oerlikon 
When compared to the Oerlikon cannon which was made out of 250 parts, the Polsten was made out of 119 parts, without sacrificing the effectiveness or the reliability of the cannon. Simplification of the design of the Polsten cannon made its production much cheaper. The cost of one Oerlikon cannon was about £350, while the cost of the Polsten was between £60 and £70. In January 1944, the 21st Army Group decided that only 20 mm Polsten guns would be used as a standard light gun to simplify supply. The Polsten was used as a substitute for the Oerlikon in the same roles, one of which was as an airborne unit anti-aircraft gun, used in Operation Market Garden. It was used on a wheeled mounting that could be towed behind a jeep.

Various double, triple and quadruple mounts were developed.  John Inglis Limited of Toronto, Ontario, in Canada produced many thousands of guns and some 500 quadruple mountings that saw limited service at the end of the war. These multiple mounts were both trailered and truck-mounted. Polsten Guns, magazines and ammunition boxes were also made in Australia by General Motors Holden in South Australia's Woodville and Beverley Plants during WW2. They were used by the Australian Army onshore and on small boats. Several prototype gun mountings were also developed but did not see service.

Uses 
The Polsten gun was used for armoured vehicles equipped with anti-aircraft guns based on the Cromwell/Centaur tank and for the Skink anti-aircraft tank.

The Polsten was also mounted on British LVTs and on early models of the Centurion tank, not coaxially with the main gun but in an independent mount on the left hand side of the turret.

The Polsten was used by the anti-aircraft platoons of some British infantry battalions during the North European campaign of 1944-45.

Etymology 
The origin of the name is not entirely clear. Some sources suggest Poland and the "Sten Company" to give Pol-sten, though the Sten gun was not made by a Sten Company. Official (United Kingdom) sources indicate the name to have been a compound based on Poland and the Royal Small Arms Factory Enfield in the same manner as the Bren gun (Brno + Enfield) or Sten (Shephard, Turpin + Enfield); also to reflect the gun design being mostly Polish (and the magazine mostly Czech) and the 8 Polish engineers in the design department. The "Sten" ending may also have linked in with the idea of the gun as a cheaper and quicker to produce weapon just like that gun was.

Operators
Former operators

See also
 Polski Sten, the actual Polish derivate of the Sten gun

Notes

References

External links

 Airborne Polsten gun
 Anti-Aircraft: Polsten 20mm Quad

World War II anti-aircraft guns
World War II weapons of the United Kingdom
World War II weapons of Poland
20 mm artillery
Autocannon
Poland–United Kingdom military relations